Vanderbilt Beach is an unincorporated community in Collier County, Florida, United States. It is located north of the Pelican Bay census-designated place and west of Naples Park, along the Gulf of Mexico. Vanderbilt Beach shares the ZIP code 34108 with Naples Park and North Naples.

References

Unincorporated communities in Collier County, Florida
Unincorporated communities in Florida